Roman Vartolomeu (born May 9, 1950) is a Romanian flatwater canoer who competed in the early 1970s. He won a silver medal in the K-4 1000 m event at the 1972 Summer Olympics in Munich.

Vartolomeu also won a bronze medal in the K-1 4 x 500 m event at the 1973 ICF Canoe Sprint World Championships in Tampere.

References

1950 births
Canoeists at the 1972 Summer Olympics
Living people
Olympic canoeists of Romania
Olympic silver medalists for Romania
Romanian male canoeists
Olympic medalists in canoeing
ICF Canoe Sprint World Championships medalists in kayak
Medalists at the 1972 Summer Olympics